Draco bimaculatus, the two-spotted flying lizard, is a species of agamid lizard. It is found in the Philippines.

References

Draco (genus)
Reptiles of the Philippines
Reptiles described in 1864
Taxa named by Albert Günther